The 1930 European Figure Skating Championships were held in Berlin, Germany. Elite senior-level figure skaters from European ISU member nations competed for the title of European Champion in the disciplines of men's singles, for the first time ladies' singles, and pair skating.

Results

Men

Ladies

Pairs

References

External links
 results

European Figure Skating Championships, 1930
European Figure Skating Championships, 1930
European Figure Skating Championships
European 1930
European Figure Skating Championships, 1930